Józef Michał Poniatowski (Rome, 24 July 1814 – London, 4 July 1873) was a Polish szlachcic, a composer and an operatic tenor. He was the nephew of the Polish general  Prince Józef Antoni Poniatowski.

Early life 
Jozef Michal Poniatowski (Joseph Michael Xavier Francis John) was born Giuseppe Michele Saverio Francesco Giovanni Luci in Rome, the son of Stanisław Poniatowski and Cassandra Luci. He was legitimated as a son of Stanisław Poniatowski in 1847, and he became a naturalized Tuscan.

Career
He studied music under Ceccherini at Florence. He wrote numerous operas for Italian and French theatres. Poniatowski was sent to Paris as plenipotentiary by Grand Duke Leopold II. He was created the 1st Conte di Monte Rotondo on 20 November 1847, and the first Principe di Monte Rotondo on 19 November 1850 by Grand Duke of Tuscany Leopold II.

In 1854, Napoleon III made him a senator and a naturalized French citizen.

Personal life 

In 1834, he married Matilda Perotti (1814–1875) at Florence. Together, they had one son who was born in Florence :

 Stanisław Stanislaus August Friedrich Józef Telemach Poniatowski (1835–1908), who married Louise Le Hon, biological daughter of Charles de Morny, Duke of Morny and Fanny Mosselman, Countess Le Hon.

Poniatowski died and was buried in Chislehurst, Kent in 1873.

References

External links 
 
 Works by Józef Michał Poniatowski in digital library Polona

1816 births
1873 deaths
Musicians from Rome
Polish opera composers
Jozef Michal
French Senators of the Second Empire
Polish composers
19th-century Polish male opera singers
Polish operatic tenors
Italian people of Polish descent
19th-century classical composers
Polish male classical composers
19th-century Italian male opera singers
Chamberlains of the Gran Duke of Tuscany